Pakistan Customs cricket team were a first-class cricket side of no fixed abode that played in domestic tournaments in Pakistan from 1972–73 to 2009–10, representing the Pakistan Customs service. They never won the Quaid-e-Azam Trophy, but did win the Patron's Trophy once.

They played 122 matches, with 25 wins, 56 losses and 41 draws. Their highest score, and only double century, was 210 not out by Imraan Mohammad against Gujranwala in 1999–2000. Their best innings bowling figures were 8 for 64 by Nadeem Iqbal against Habib Bank Limited in 1998-99.

Honours
 Quaid-e-Azam Trophy (0)
 Patron's Trophy (1)
 2000-01

Notable players
  Fawad Ahmed
  Fawad Alam
  Hamid Hassan
  Rana Naved-ul-Hasan
  Mohammad Nabi
  Mohammad Sami
  Murtaza Hussain
  Saad Janjua
  Bilal Shafayat
  Qasim Sheikh
  Ali Imran Zaidi

References

External links
 Pakistan Customs at CricketArchive

Pakistani first-class cricket teams
Former senior cricket clubs of Pakistan
Pakistan Customs